The 1876 Huntingdon by-election was fought on 16 February 1876.  The byelection was fought due to the resignation of the incumbent Conservative MP, John Burgess Karslake.  It was won by the unopposed Conservative candidate Viscount Hinchingbrooke.

References

1876 in England
1876 elections in the United Kingdom
Politics of Huntingdonshire
By-elections to the Parliament of the United Kingdom in Cambridgeshire constituencies
19th century in Huntingdonshire
Unopposed by-elections to the Parliament of the United Kingdom in English constituencies